IPIC may refer to:

Technology
 IPIC Treaty, see Integrated circuit layout design protection
 IPIC, computer network protocol, see IBM TXSeries

Organisations
 International Petroleum Investment Company
 Intellectual Property Institute of Canada, founded by Gordon Henderson (lawyer)

See also